is a 2014 Japanese action comedy film directed by Yukihiko Tsutsumi and the second film in the Kanjani Sentai Eightranger film series, following Eight Ranger (2012). It will be released on 26 July 2014.

Cast
You Yokoyama
Subaru Shibutani
Shingo Murakami
Ryuhei Maruyama
Shota Yasuda
Ryo Nishikido
Tadayoshi Okura
Atsuko Maeda

References

External links
 

2014 action comedy films
Films directed by Yukihiko Tsutsumi
Films set in the future
Japanese action comedy films
Kanjani Eight
2014 films
2014 comedy films
2010s Japanese films